Hey Girl was a Taiwanese girl group. Channel [V] held an audition for the show Blackie's Teenage Club (我愛黑澀會), a variety show that aims to create new female entertainers in Taiwan. At the end of 2005, Channel [V] picked nine members to represent the other girls. These nine members were Gui Gui, Ning Er, MeiMei, Apple, Hsiao Hsun, Ya Tou, Hsiao Man, Bae Tung Tung, and Ta Ya. Together, they are affectionately known as the Nine Beauties for short.

The nine members were separated into two groups for their third EP release: Ta Ya, Hsiao Man, Ya Tou, Gui Gui, and Apple comprised Pink, and Mei Mei, Hsiao Hsun, Ning Er, and Bae Tung Tung comprised Honey.

Issues and Scandals

Departure of Bae Tung Tung
On October 5, 2007, Bae Tung Tung left Hey Girl (including the Wo Ai Hei Se Hui show). It is rumoured that she left because of a rift with band leader Ta Ya over an alleged affair with Bae Tung Tung's boyfriend at the time, Hakka-Pac; other sources suggest that Bae Tung Tung was forced to depart due to violations of her contract. Bae Tung Tung reports that she began cutting herself during this stressful period.

Moving forward, Bae Tung Tung has stated that she plans to concentrate on her singing and dancing. She is currently working for Momo Kids, a Taiwanese television company featuring children's programming.

Departure of Gui Gui
Gui Gui has currently left the management of Channel V, where all the band members originate from. Andy Ge has admitted to the press that she is unlikely to renew her contract, with an ambiguous post on her own blog, Gui Gui had admitted to the news.

While Andy Ge also clarifies, Hey Girl is not under Channel V management so Gui Gui is still with Hey Girl and will be attending promotions per usual.

However, the Hey Girl promotion following his statement did not include Gui Gui who was said to be busy with MIT promotion before and during their promotion. On May 6, 2009, Andy Ge announced to the press that Gui Gui will not be renewing her contract with Channel V, he also states that her involvement with Hey Girl will have to be clarified with Warner Music, as Hey Girl do not belong to Channel V.

Departure of Hsiao Man 
Hsiao Man has currently left the management of Channel V. She has signed to Eelin Model Agency. She has decided to leave Hey Girl to become a model.

Departure of Yeun Fei 
On September 16, 2010, members of Hey Girl performed at an event in Nanchang which did not include Yeun Fei. Instead, it was a new member who was emerged from the event's promotional poster and the Hey Girl members' blogs. Ya Tou later confirmed in her Sina blog that Yeun Fei is no long a member of Hey Girl, but will continue to appear on the "Black Lollipop" show. The newest member, Chi Ting (子庭), has not yet appeared on any of the Channel V related shows and many fans seemed baffled and upset about the departure of Yeun Fei. Further speculations have suggested that the switch maybe due to Yeun Fei's high-profile relationship with one of the Didi "EDD", which the management frowns upon.

Departure of Si Ya 
As of April 2011, Si Ya's personal "weibo" has listed herself as "without a management agent/agency".  Subsequently, she did not appear in any of Hey Girl's promotional activities in China. She did, however, appeared in number of variety shows such as 麻辣天后宫 and 鑽石夜總會 as one of the special guests. On May 5, 2011, the Hong Kong promotion company has unveiled the "new" Hey Girl member which included only Ya Tou, Hsiao Hsun, and Chi Ting.

Departure of other members 
Ta Ya, Ning Er, MeiMei & Apple had also decided to leave Hey Girl as they are now signed to Andy Ge's new agency company "A Legend Star Ltd". Ya Tou and Hsiao Hsun are still in Hey Girl, but with two new members, Si Ya and Yeun Fei. Although it has been rumoured that Ya Tou and Hsiao Hsun will also leave after they have fulfilled their contracts to join A Legend Star, which never occurred.

Departure of Chi Ting, Ya Tou, Hsiao Hsun 
They left Hey Girl because their newest single Hey Girl did not sell well. They will not perform together for another 1 year.  Ya Tou & Chi Ting have changed their talent agency to Jack Production (Ya Tou at 2013) & Yi Teng Entertainment (Chi Ting at 2014), just Hsiao Hsun stayed at M'stone International. This means that Hey Girl is disbanded. Chi Ting also married Andrew Lin in September 2014.

Name Change
Originally, the group's name, Hei Se Hui Mei Mei, is a pun on the words "Mei Mei" and "Hei She Hui". Later, after the group's move to Warner Music Taiwan, its name was changed to 黑Girl, and the English name officially became Hey Girl. The change in name resulted from the record company's concerns that scandalous rumors of other members of the show Wo Ai Hei Se Hui would be associated with Hei Se Hui Mei Mei (Hey Girl).

Members

Julie Tsai (Bay Tong Tong)
Birth Name: Tsai Ti-Tong (Chinese: 蔡玓彤)
Birthdate: 
Stage Name: Bae Tong Tong (Chinese: 貝童彤) & Tong Tong Chieh Chieh (Chinese: 彤彤姐姐)
Old Stage Name: Tong Tong (Chinese: 彤彤)
English Name: Julie Tsai
Languages: Mandarin
Profession: Actress, Singer, and Host
Education: National Chung Hsing Senior High School
Talent agency: Hsingheng Entertainment
Position: Main Dancer, Lead Vocalist, Rapper

Emma Wu (Gui Gui)
Birth Name: Wu Ying-Chieh (Chinese: 吳映潔)
Birthdate: 
Stage Name: Gui Gui (Chinese: 鬼鬼)
English Name: Emma Wu
Languages: Mandarin, Taiwanese, English
Profession: Actress, Host and Singer
Education: Jhuang Jing Vocational School (Performing Arts)
Talent agency: Emma Wu Studio
Position: Sub Vocalist, Rapper

Tina Chou (Ta Ya)
Name: Chou Yi-Pei (Chinese: 周宜霈)
Old Name: Chou Yun-Chen (Chinese: 周雲溱)
Birth Name: Chou Yi-Chun (Chinese: 周怡君)
Birthdate: 
Stage Name: Ta Ya (Chinese:大牙) 
English Name:  Tina Chou
Language: Mandarin
Profession: Actress, Singer, and Host
Education: Hwa Kang Arts School (Taipei, Taiwan)
Talent agency: Sentimental Creative Studio
Position: 1st Leader, Main Vocalist, Visual

MeiMei Kuo (MeiMei)
Birth Name: Kuo Chieh-Chi (Chinese: 郭婕祈)
Birthdate: 
Stage Name: MeiMei
English Name: Alexis, Isabelle, MeiMei Kuo
Languages: Mandarin
Profession: Actress, Singer, Model and Dancer
Education: Taipei National University of the Arts and unezsa
Now in: M4 (disbanded)
Talent agency: No Limit Entertainment
Position: Vice Leader, Lead Dancer, Lead Vocalist

Apple Huang (Apple)
Birth Name: Huang Wei-Ting (Chinese: 黃暐婷)
Birthdate: 
Stage Name: Apple
English Name : Apple Huang
Language: Mandarin, Hakka, Cantonese (a little bit), Taiwanese
Profession: Actress, Singer, and Host
Education: Hwa Kang Arts School (Taipei, Taiwan)
Sister or Brother: Yuri Huang (Yao Yao) + Man Huang (A Man)
Talent agency: A Legend Star Entertainment 
Position: Lead Vocalist, Face of the group

Mini Chang (Ning Er)
Name: Chang Ning-Er (Chinese: 張甯兒)
Birth Name: Chang Hsiao-Chieh (Chinese: 張筱婕)
Birthdate: 
Stage name: Ning Er (Chinese: 甯兒)
Old Stage Name: Hsiao Chieh, Hsiao Chieh (Chinese: 筱婕, 小婕)
English Name: Mini Chang
Languages: Mandarin
Profession: Actress, Singer, Dancer, and Host
Education: Jhuang Jing Vocational School
Talent agency: A Legend Star Entertainment 
Position: Sub Vocalist

Lilu Wang (Hsiao Man)
Name: Wang Cheng-Yen (Chinese: 王承嫣)
Old Name:Wang Ching-Chiao (Chinese: 王婧喬)
Birth Name: Wang Shu-Hsuan (Chinese: 王淑萱)
Birthdate: 
Stage Name: Hsiao Man (Chinese:小蠻)
English Name: Lilu Wang
Old English Name: Chanel Wang & Shuan Wang & Suan Wang
Language: Mandarin, Taiwanese, English
Profession: Actress, Singer, and Model
Education: National Chung Hsing Senior High School
Talent agency: Oneness Music Entertainment
Position: Sub Vocalist

Ruby Lin (Yong Tu)
Name:  Lin Ting-Yu (Chinese: 林筳諭)
Old Name: Chen Ting-Yu (Chinese: 陳筳諭) 
Birth Name: Chen Jung-Ying (Chinese: 陳融瑩)
Birthdate: 
Stage Name: Yong Tu (Chinese: 勇兔)
Old Stage Name: Lin Yeun-Fei (Chinese: 林允菲) or Yeun Fei (Chinese: 允菲)
English Name: Ruby Lin
Languages: Mandarin, Taiwanese
Profession: Dancer, Singer, and Host
Education: Jhuang Jing Vocational School
Talent agency: Chuan Hsuan Media Studio
Position: Lead Dancer, Sub Vocalist

Candy Chen (Si Ya)
Name: Chen Si-Ya (Chinese: 陳斯亞)
Birth Name: Cheng Yu-Ting (Chinese: 鄭羽婷)
Birthdate: 
Stage Name: Si Ya(Chinese: 斯亞)
Old Stage Name: Tang Kuo, Yi Ling (Chinese: 糖果, 伊凌)
English Name: Candy Chen
Old English Name: Emily Cheng & Nina Chen
Languages: Mandarin, Taiwanese, English
Profession: Dancer and Singer
Education: Nan Chiang Industrial and Commercial Senior High School 
Related group: Twinko (2013–2016)
Talent agency: Easy C&C
Position: Main Dancer, Lead Vocalist, Visual

Yako Chan (Ya Tou)
Name: Chan Tzu-Ching (Chinese: 詹子晴)
Birth Name: Chan Ya-Wen (Chinese: 詹雅文) 
Birthdate: 
Stage Name: Ya Tou (Chinese: 丫頭)
English Name: Yako Chan
Languages: Mandarin, English, Korean (a little bit)
Profession: Actress and Singer
Education: Hsing Wu College (English Program) Taipei, Taiwan
Talent agency: Easy C&C
Position: 2nd Leader, Lead Dancer, Sub Vocalist, Rapper, Face of the group

Mia Chang (Tzu Ting)
Name: Chang Tzu-Ting (Chinese: 張子庭)
Birth Name: Chang Ting-Wei (Chinese: 張庭瑋)
Birthdate: 
Stage Name: Tzu Ting (Chinese: 子庭)
Old Stage Name: Hung Tou, Chang Ai-Ping, Ting Ting (Chinese: 紅豆, 張艾蘋, 庭庭)
English Name: Mia Chang
Spouse: Andrew Lin (林聖仁) (2014 Sep  – present)
Languages: Mandarin, Taiwanese, English
Profession: Dancer, Singer and Model
Education: Chinese Culture University
Related group: Red Bean Girls (2005)
Talent agency: Yi Teng Entertainment
Position: Main Dancer, Lead Vocalist

Esther Huang (Hsiao Hsun)
Birth Name: Huang Ching-Yi (Chinese: 黃瀞怡)
Birthdate: 
Stage Name: Hsiao Hsun (Chinese: 小薰)
English Name: Esther Huang
Old English Name: Albee Huang
Languages: Mandarin, Taiwanese, English, Atayal
Profession: Actress and singer
Education: Hsin Sheng College of Medical Care and Management
Talent agency: Fortune Entertainment
Position: Main Vocalist, Visual

Filmography

2006
 Angel Lover (2006) – Hsiao Hsun 小薰, Da Ya 大牙
 Taipei Family series (English:Taipei Family) (2006–2007) – Ya Tou 丫頭

2007
 Brown Sugar Macchiato (2007) – Apple, Da Ya 大牙, MeiMei, Pei Tong Tong 貝童彤, Ya Tou 丫頭, Hsiao Hsun 小薰, Gui Gui 鬼鬼, Hsiao Man 小蠻, Ning Er 甯兒
 Wayward Kenting – Da Ya 大牙
 Brown Sugar Come (2007) – Da Ya 大牙, MeiMei, Apple, and Hsiao Man 小蠻 (online drama)
 Does It 18+? (2007) – Hsiao Hsun 小薰

2008
 Rolling Love – – Hsiao Hsun 小薰
 The Legend of Brown Sugar Chivalries – – Hsiao Hsun 小薰, Ya Tou 丫頭, Hsiao Man 小蠻,(Main Cast) Mei Mei, Gui Gui 鬼鬼, Da Ya 大牙, Apple, Ning Er 甯兒, Yeun Fei 允菲 (Minor Characters)
 Mysterious Incredible Terminator – – Gui Gui 鬼鬼

2011
 Story 33 – (]- Ya Tou 丫頭, Hsiao Hsun 小薰, Si Ya 斯亞
 Love You – (]- Hsiao Hsun 小薰
 Rookies' Diary – (]- Hsiao Hsun 小薰
 Love Keeps Going – (]- Hsiao Hsun 小薰

2012
 What Is Love (2012 Drama) – (]- Hsiao Hsun 小薰
 Love Me or Leave Me (2012 Drama) – (]- Hsiao Hsun 小薰

2014
Fabulous 30 – (]- Hsiao Hsun 小薰

Short film

2012
 Eden Eternal – (]- Hsiao Hsun 小薰, Ya Tou 丫頭, Chi Ting 子庭

Film

2011
 Bu Dai Shuai Wei – (]- Ya Tou 丫頭

2012
 Love Is Sin – (]- Hsiao Hsun 小薰
 Double Trouble – (]- Hsiao Hsun 小薰, Ya Tou 丫頭, Chi Ting 子庭
 Legend of the T-Dog – (]- Ya Tou 丫頭

2013
 The Ideal City – (]- Hsiao Hsun 小薰

Discography

Digital Singles

Collaborations

Albums
2008 – Hey Girl First Debut Album (黑Girl首張同名專輯)

EP
 2006 – I Love Blackie Beauties (我愛黑澀會美眉)
 2006 – Beauties' Private Day – Pink/Honey (美眉私密的一天 – 粉紅高壓電 / 甜心轟炸機)
 2007 – Beauties' Private Party : Happiness Bubble (美眉私密Party:幸福的泡泡)
 2011 – Hey Girl

Soundtrack
 2007 – Brown Sugar Macchiato OST (黑糖瑪奇朵偶像劇原聲帶)
 2008 – The Legend of the Brown Sugar Chivalries OST (黑糖群俠傳電視原聲帶)

DVD
 2006 I Love Blackie Beauties Secret Dairy
 2007 Blackie Beauties Secret Party

Photo-books 
 2007 Beauties' Private Party Full Colour Photo-book

References

H
H